Theoretical Girl (Amy Turnnidge) is a female songwriter and multi-instrumentalist from Southend on Sea signed to the Memphis Industries record label. On her Myspace page, she describes her music as "Electro / Folk / Classical".

Discography

Albums 

 Divided - Memphis Industries, CD, MP3 (2009) / Soft Power Records, 12" LP, MP3 (2010)

Singles 
 "It's All Too Much" – Fake Product (2006)
 "Red Mist" – Half Machine Records (2007)
 "The Hypocrite" – Salvia/XL Recordings (2008)
 "Another Fight" – Salvia/XL Recordings (2008)
 "Nursery Academy" – Split single on Pure Groove (2008)
 "Rivals" – Memphis Industries (2009)
 "Red Mist" - Memphis Industries (2009)

Performances 

Theoretical Girl has gigged throughout Europe, the USA and Asia over the past three years either with just her guitar and backing tracks or backed by her band "The Equations", whose members went on to join bands such as Ipso Facto and Yassassin.  Bands she has played with include Robyn, Maxïmo Park, Kate Nash, Lethal Bizzle, Calvin Harris, Good Shoes, and Metric.

She received a 4/5 review by The Guardian for her live performance.  Theoretical Girl appeared at the 2009 Glastonbury festival and SXSW. She also toured Asia, playing Tokyo and Hong Kong.

Awards
In 2009, Theoretical Girl was awarded a grant by the PRS Foundation and invited to perform at their showcase at the SXSW Festival in Austin, Texas.

References

Living people
People from Southend-on-Sea
Music in Southend-on-Sea
English songwriters
English women pop singers
Year of birth missing (living people)
21st-century English musicians
21st-century English women